SEMS may refer to:

 Self-expandable metallic stent, a medical tube to hold open the gastrointestinal tract
 A screw with a pre-assembled washer
 A nut with a pre-assembled washer
 Stock Exchange of Malaysia and Singapore (SEMS)